Hankovce is a village and municipality in Humenné District in the Prešov Region of north-east Slovakia.

History
In historical records the village was first mentioned in 1567.

Geography
The municipality lies at an altitude of 182 metres and covers an area of 8.547 km2.
It has a population of about 560 people.

Genealogical resources

The records for genealogical research are available at the state archive "Statny Archiv in Presov, Slovakia"

 Roman Catholic church records (births/marriages/deaths): 1786-1895 (parish B)
 Greek Catholic church records (births/marriages/deaths): 1770-1902 (parish B)

See also
 List of municipalities and towns in Slovakia

References

External links
 
 Surnames of living people in Hankovce
 

Villages and municipalities in Humenné District
Zemplín (region)